National Preservation Party was a political party in Iceland.

History
The party was founded on 15 March 1953 by members of the Progressive Party, Social Democratic Party and Socialist Party. It won two seats in the June 1953 elections, taken by Gils Guðmundsson and Bergur Sigurbjörnsson. Party members also gained seats on the student council of the University of Iceland, Akureyri local council and Reykjavík city council.

However, it lost both Althing seats in the 1956 elections. It failed to win a seat in the June and October elections in 1959, and thereafter only contested elections as part of the People's Alliance. Guðmundsson gained a seat, which he held until 1979. Sigurbjörnsson did not succeed in winning back his seat, but served twice in the Althing during the 1963-1967 term, replacing other MPs.

In 1970 some party members left the People's Alliance to establish the Union of Liberals and Leftists.

Ideology
The party's main policy was a neutral foreign policy. It opposed Icelandic membership of NATO and the presence of American military bases in the country. Domestically, it had a liberal, social-democratic platform, supporting a mixed economy with both private and public participation.

Election results

References

Defunct political parties in Iceland
1953 establishments in Iceland
Political parties established in 1953
Political parties with year of disestablishment missing